An airman is a member of an air force or air arm of a nation's armed forces. In certain air forces, it can also refer to a specific enlisted rank. An airman can also be referred as a soldier in other definitions.

In civilian aviation usage, the term airman is analogous to the term sailor in nautical usage. In the American Federal Aviation Administration usage, an airman is any holder of an airman's certificate, male or female. This certificate is issued to those who qualify for it by the Federal Aviation Administration Airmen Certification Branch.

United States

Air Force

In the U.S. Air Force, airman is a general term which can refer to any member of the United States Air Force, regardless of rank, but is also a specific enlisted rank in the Air Force. The rank of airman (abbreviated "Amn") is the second enlisted rank from the bottom, just above the rank of Airman Basic, and just below that of Airman First Class. Since the Air Force was established in 1947, all of the various ranks of "airman" have always included women, and in this context, the word "man" means "human being". Former U.S. Air Force ranks included Airman Second Class and Airman Third Class.  The current E-2 paygrade rank of Airman was called Airman Third Class from 1952 to 1967.

A person with the rank of Airman Basic is typically promoted to the rank of Airman after six months of active duty service in the Air Force, if that member had signed up for an enlistment period of at least four years of active duty. On the other hand, an enlistee could be promoted to the rank of Airman immediately after completing Air Force basic training (and thus paid somewhat more) given one of several additional qualifications:

Having completed at least two years of a Junior Reserve Officers' Training Corps (Junior ROTC) while in high school.
Having achieved the Eagle Scout level from the Boy Scouts of America, or the Gold Award from the Girl Scouts of the United States of America.
Having earned 20 college semester credit hours (30 quarter hours).

Those enlistees who have qualified for these early promotions to the rank of Airman are allowed to wear their single airman insignia stripe during the Air Force basic training graduation ceremony at Lackland Air Force Base in San Antonio, Texas. They also receive a retroactive pay increment that brings them up to the pay grade for an Airman upon their completion of basic training. (Thus, it is as if they have enlisted as Airmen on the first day, as far as their pay is concerned. However, if they do not complete basic training and are discharged, they do not receive the extra pay.)

While at the rank of Airman, the duties of enlisted personnel include adjusting to the Air Force way of military life and becoming proficient in their Air Force duty specialties. Note that upon leaving basic training, all Airmen enter a period of many weeks or many months of training at Air Force schools in their duty specialties that they and the Air Force have selected for them depending on their aptitudes and interests, and the needs of the Air Force. For Airmen with high aptitudes, some of these training programs include more than one school and take a year or more to complete.

Airmen are often nicknamed “mosquito wings" due to the insignia's resemblance to a mosquito's small wings.

Navy

In the U.S. Navy, Airman is the enlisted rank that corresponds to the pay grade of E-3 in the Navy's aviation field, but it is just below the rank of Petty Officer Third Class, pay grade E-4.

Coast Guard
In the U.S. Coast Guard, the ranks are very similar or identical to the ones in the U.S. Navy, and a Coast Guard airman is identical in rank and pay to an Airman in the Navy. Coast Guard Airman is the enlisted rank that corresponds to the pay grade of E-3 in the Coast Guard's aviation field, and includes both men and women. Airman is just above the Coast Guard rank of airman apprentice, Seaman Apprentice, fireman apprentice which is the E-2 pay grade, but it is just below the rank of Petty Officer Third Class, E-4 pay grade.

Venezuela

The rank is used by the National Bolivarian Armed Forces of Venezuela.

See also
Military pilot
Soldier
Sailor
Marine
RAF enlisted ranks
Aircraftman

Notes

References

Airmen
Military ranks
Combat occupations